The Botswana Society is a learned society in Botswana. Founded in 1969, the Botswana Society aims to advance "knowledge of Botswana in all disciplines and on all aspects of the nation's cultural, scientific and environmental heritage".

When the Botswana Society was formed, it played a crucial role in shaping Botswana's research agenda. Its annual journal, Botswana Notes and Records., was the country's first research journal and published many seminal articles through the 1970s. The Society has also published a number of books on the country's heritage ranging from botany to zoology. During its heyday in the 1970s and 1980s, the Botswana Society sponsored a number of important national conferences on issues of national importance, and helped shape government policy agendas on issues such as tourism, wildlife, and land policy. During this time, the Botswana Society was led by Alec Campbell, who maintained its high profile in his other capacity as director of Botswana's National Museum & Art Gallery.

As Botswana's economy grew and the country achieved middle-income status, many of the Botswana's Society's original functions were taken over by new university and governmental bodies. In order to carve out a new niche for itself, the Botswana Society has refocused on promoting cultural tourism in the country. It runs a popular bus tour of the capital, Gaborone, and collaborates with local communities to develop relevant tourist sites.

References

External links
Botswana Society website

Learned societies of Botswana
Organizations established in 1969